Sir Kamuta Latasi  (born September 4, 1936) is a political figure from the Pacific nation of Tuvalu from Funafuti atoll. He was elected to the Parliament of Tuvalu in 1992. Latasi served as the 4th Prime Minister of Tuvalu from 1993 until 1996. He has served as the Speaker of parliament from 2006 to September 2010 and again from December 2010   to March 2014.

Prime Minister of Tuvalu
The general election held on 25 November 1993 resulted in the members being evenly split in their support of the incumbent prime minister Bikenibeu Paeniu and the former prime minister Tomasi Puapua. As a consequence, the governor-general dissolved the parliament on 22 September and a further election took place on 25 November 1993. The subsequent parliament elected Kamuta Latasi as prime minister on 10 December 1993, with a 7:5 majority over the group a members of parliament headed by former prime minister Bikenibeu Paeniu. 

Kamuta Latasi was the prime minister until 24 December 1996. As the result of the vote on a motion of no confidence Kamuta Latasi resigned and Bikenibeu Paeniu was elected as prime minister for the second time. In the general election of 26 March 1998 Latasi lost his seat.

While many Tuvaluan politicians tend to avoid organising themselves along partisan lines, Latasi is noted for his republican leanings, together with former prime minister, the late Ionatana Ionatana.

Flag issue

One notable issue during the premiership of Latasi was the question of the design of the national flag of Tuvalu, which included a British Union Jack, reduced in size.

In a manner which some Tuvaluans regarded as arbitrary, Latasi changed the flag to another design which omitted the Union Jack. Supporters of Latasi held that this measure symbolically distanced Tuvalu from the colonial period. This change, however, proved to be short-lived, since Latasi's successor (Bikenibeu Paeniu) implemented a reversion to the former design.

Personal background
Sir Kamuta Latasi is a landowner and long-time politician. His wife, Naama Maheu Latasi, was also a member of the Parliament of Tuvalu from 1989 to 1997. She died on 16 March 2012.

Speaker of the Parliament of Tuvalu
From 2006 to 2010, Latasi was the Speaker of parliament. He was re-elected to parliament by his constituency of Funafuti in the 2010 general election. Latasi was not the speaker during the short term of the government of Maatia Toafa. On 25 December 2010 Willy Telavi was elected prime minister with an (8:7) majority over Enele Sopoaga. Latasi was appointed Speaker.

Prime minister Telavi lost his majority as the result of the death of Lotoala Metia. prime minister Willy Telavi delayed calling a by-election following the death of the member from Nukufetau until the opposition took legal action, which resulted in the High Court ordering the prime minister to issue a notice to hold the by-election. The 2013 Nukufetau by-election was won by the opposition candidate.

On 30 July 2013, during the attempts of the opposition to present a no-confidence motion in the government of Willy Telavi, Latasi refused to allow a debate on the motion. The Tuvaluan constitutional crisis continued until the governor-general Iakoba Italeli then proceeded to exercise his reserve powers to order Mr Telavi's removal and appoint Enele Sopoaga as interim prime minister. The governor-general also ordered that parliament sit on Friday 2 August to allow a vote of no-confidence in Mr Telavi and his government.

Again on 2 August 2013 Willy Tevali faced a motion of no confidence, the voting was eight for the motion, four against and one abstention and Kamuta Latasi abstained for voting on the motion.

On 4 March 2014 Latasi was replaced as Speaker by Otinielu Tausi, with Prime Minister Enele Sopoaga stating that the government needed a Speaker who shared its general viewpoints. He thenceforth sat on the Opposition benches.

Knighthood
Latasi was made a knight of the KCMG in the 2007 Birthday Honours. He was given his insignia in January 2008.

Acting Governor-General
In 2010 Latasi was appointed acting Governor-General between the terms of Sir Filoimea Telito and Sir Iakoba Italeli.

2015 general election
Sir Kamuta Latasi and Kausea Natano were re-elected in the 2015 general election. Sir Kamuta Latasi resigned as MP on 17 October 2018.

See also
 Politics of Tuvalu

References

External links
 "Court Circular", The Times, 3 January 2008 (announcing Sir Kamuta's knighthood and accession to the Privy Council)

1936 births
Living people
People from Funafuti
Speakers of the Parliament of Tuvalu
Knights Commander of the Order of St Michael and St George
Members of the Privy Council of the United Kingdom
Officers of the Order of the British Empire
Prime Ministers of Tuvalu
Date of birth missing (living people)
Tuvaluan republicans